Typhoon Irving, known in the Philippines as Tropical Storm Ruping, was a mid-season tropical cyclone that affected the Philippines and China during September 1982. An area of disturbed weather developed within the monsoon trough during early September 1982 near Guam. Following an increase in organization, a tropical depression developed on the morning of September 5. Later that day, the depression intensified into Tropical Storm Irving. Irving tracked westward, nearly becoming a typhoon before hitting the central Philippines. There, Irving uprooted trees, downed power and telephone lines, triggered landslides, and forced the cancellation of several domestic airline flights. Irving damaged 7,890 houses in Albay and Sorsogon provinces alone, resulting in 138,500 people homeless. Nation-wide, 65 people were killed, 26 others were hurt, and 29 were rendered missing. A total of 44,383 families or 248,040 residents sought shelter. Moreover, 18,488 homes were damaged and 5,599 others were demolished. Damage in the country was assessed at US$23.3 million, including US$14.2 million in crops. While crossing the island chain, Irving turned northwestward. After entering the South China Sea, Irving continued generally northwest, and became a typhoon on September 11. After developing a well-defined eye, Irving attained its peak intensity of  the following day. Land interaction with Hainan Island resulted in a weakening trend, and Irving was downgraded to a tropical storm before striking the southern coast of China on September 15. Across the Leizhou Peninsula, 90% of homes were damaged. Onshore, Irving rapidly weakened and the storm dissipated on September 16.

Meteorological history

Typhoon Irving originated from an area of poorly organized convection associated with an active monsoon trough anchored south of Guam in early September 1982. By the morning of September 4, a low-level circulation had become evident on visual satellite imagery, despite a decrease in deep convection. In response to a decrease in wind shear that followed the development of Typhoon Judy and passage of Typhoon Gordon east of Japan, conditions became more favorable for tropical cyclogenesis. The circulation then became more developed and an increase in cloud organization was seen on satellite imagery, prompting the issuance of a Tropical Cyclone Formation Alert early on September 5. At 06:00 UTC, the Japan Meteorological Agency (JMA) upgraded the system into a tropical depression, and three hours later, the Joint Typhoon Warning Center (JTWC) classified the system as Tropical Depression 18, after a Hurricane hunter aircraft closed off a surface circulation with observed winds near . Based on continued convective organization, Tropical Depression 18 was upgraded to Tropical Storm Irving at 18:00 UTC on September 5 by the JTWC, 
with the JMA following suit six hours later.

At the time of the upgrade, Irving was characterized with an exposed low-level circulation center to the east of the deep convection, where the upper-level circulation was. Through September 8, Irving tracked south of a strengthening subtropical ridge and maintained a westward track across the Philippine Sea. An eye developed on early on September 8, indicating a strengthening trend. Irving made landfall at 09:00 UTC on September 8 on the southern tip of Luzon. Over land, the eye quickly disappeared from satellite imagery. Thereafter, Irving assumed a more northwestward path through the Sibuyan Sea and crossed the central Philippines. Despite losing organization due to land interaction, Irving maintained much of its intensity.

As Irving moved into the South China Sea, a return to a more westward track and gradual intensification were forecast by the JTWC, in part because the subtropical ridge was anticipated to remain anchored north of the system. However, this ridge proved to be weaker than expected and Irving tracked slowly northwestward instead. Post-storm analysis by the JTWC, however, revealed that Irving attained typhoon intensity about 24 hours earlier, early on September 11. At the time of its peak, Typhoon Irving had a very tight circulation, with the radius of  winds within  of the center during this period of maximum intensity. On September 15, as the system began to interact with Hainan Island and the coast of China, Irving was downgraded to tropical storm strength by the JTWC and the JMA. Irving thereafter rapidly dissipated over the mountainous area of Vietnam.

Impact
Across the Philippines, Irving battered a dozen provinces in the southern section of Luzon, toppling trees and ripping off rooftops. Moreover, the storm also uprooted trees, downed power and telephone lines, triggered landslides. The storm also forced the cancellation of several domestic airline flights and prompted the closure of schools. Irving damaged 7,890 houses in the Albay and Sorsogon provinces alone, which displaced 23,101 families, or about 138,500 people. Most of the casualties occurred when people were downed by falling trees or falling debris. Two people perished due to a landslide southeast of Manila. Moreover, 15 people died in the Batangas City, where electrical and water supplies was cut for two days. Twenty-three were wounded. However, damage to crops, especially rice, was minor. Throughout the country, 65 people were killed, 26 people were hurt, and 29 people were rendered missing. A total of 44,383 families or 248,040 residents were evacuated to shelter. In addition, 18,488 homes were damaged and 5,599 others were demolished. Damage in the country was assessed at US$23.3 million, including US$14.2 million in crops. Following the storm, President Ferdinand Marcos ordered for the release of $294,000 in aid.

Further north, in Hong Kong, a No 1. hurricane signal was issued a little after noon on September 11. Later that day, the signal was increased to a No. 3 signal, only to drop to a No. 1 signal on September 14. All signals were dropped late on September 15. Tate's Cairn observed  of rain over a five-day period, including  in a 24-hour period. In all, damage in Hong Kong was minor. Across the Leizhou Peninsula, serious crop damage was reported and 90% of homes were damaged.

See also

 Typhoon Ellen (1983) - stronger but similar track and time of year

Notes

References

Irving
Irving
Irving
Irving
Irving
Irving
Irving